is a Japanese manga series written by Buronson and illustrated by Kentaro Miura. It was serialized in Hakusensha's Monthly Animal House in 1989, with its chapters collected in a single tankōbon volume. A sequel, titled Ōrō Den, was serialized in Monthly Animal House, with its chapters collected in a single tankōbon volume.

Plot

Publication
King of Wolves is written by Buronson and illustrated by Kentaro Miura. It was serialized in Hakusensha's Monthly Animal House in 1989. Its chapters were collected in a single tankōbon volume, released on December 18, 1989. A sequel, titled , was serialized in Monthly Animal House in 1990. Its chapters were collected in a single tankōbon, released on August 24, 1990. A bunkoban volume, which includes both series, was published on March 13, 1998. Young Animal Zero started republishing the series on September 13, 2021.

In North America, King of Wolves was licensed for English release by Dark Horse Comics. The volume was published on May 25, 2005.

Reception
In Manga: The Complete Guide, author Jason Thompson gave the series 1½ out of four stars and wrote: "The only mildly amusing premise is basically an excuse for Miura to draw macho sword fights and hordes of cavalry. Miura's crosshatched art is not at the level of Berserk or even Japan, and the fight scenes are disappointing".

References

External links

Adventure anime and manga
Hakusensha manga
Historical anime and manga
Seinen manga
Yoshiyuki Okamura